Rod McGregor (19 October 1882 –  2 August 1962) was an Australian rules footballer for the Carlton Football Club in the (then) Victorian Football League and, later, a broadcaster.

Family
Son of Alexander McGregor and Eliza McGregor, he was born on 19 October 1882. He married Alice May Bickford (1885–1963), the sister of Albert Bickford and Edric Bickford, in 1911.

Football
Equally skilled with both feet, and an outstanding  centreman with the ability to pass accurately to team-mates and elude opponents, he played his first senior match with Carlton against Collingwood on 13 May 1905 (round 2), aged 22, and played his 236th and last senior match, against St Kilda, on 1 May 1920 (round 1), aged 37, when he was forced to retire following a serious knee  injury.

1905-1912
He played in the 1906 and 1908 winning grand final sides, missed the 1907 premiership triumph over South Melbourne after breaking his nose in the previous week's Semi-Final against St Kilda.

1913
During the 1912 Preliminary Final, McGregor was not playing well, and Carlton captain Jack Wells asked him to play on the forward line. McGregor refused; for disobeying the captain, the Carlton Committee suspended McGregor from the Carlton team for 12 months and refused to grant him a clearance for 1913. 
"Late in the [1912 Preliminary Final], Carlton skipper Jack Wells told McGregor to push forward, but [McGregor] refused and the pair argued heatedly. Later, the matter was raised at committee level, and it was decided to make an example of one of the club’s favourite sons. McGregor was suspended for twelve months, sparking a furore within, and outside the club. To his immense credit, McGregor refused to inflame the issue, and while he did train for some time at [VFA club] North Melbourne, his heart was always with the Blues and he was back again, aged 30, in 1914."

1914–1920
Following his suspension, he played his first match (his 146th career game) against South Melbourne in round 4).

His 236 career matches for Carlton was a club record until it was broken by John Nicholls in Round 16 of 1970.

Broadcaster
Working on-air with Melbourne radio station 3LO as early as 1927, McGregor was a pioneer of football radio broadcasts.

Australian Football Hall of Fame
In 1996 McGregor was inducted into the Australian Football Hall of Fame.

See also
 1908 Melbourne Carnival

Footnotes

References 
 Blueseum: Rod McGregor Profile
 'Lynx', "How to Become a Champion Footballer", The Weekly Times, (Saturday, 30 June 1917), p.20.
 'Rover', "The Man Who Will Lead Carlton", The Weekly Times, (Saturday, 31 August 1918), p.20.
 Shelton, J.N., "Unforgettable Characters in Football: A Carlton Champion, The Sporting Globe, (Saturday, 13 September 1941), p.5.
 Ross, J. (ed), 100 Years of Australian Football 1897-1996: The Complete Story of the AFL, All the Big Stories, All the Great Pictures, All the Champions, Every AFL Season Reported, Viking, (Ringwood), 1996.  (p. 124)
 Ross, J. (ed.), The Australian Football Hall of Fame, HarperCollinsPublishers, (Pymble), 1999.  (p. 94)

External links

 Boyles Football Photos: Rod McGregor.

1882 births
1962 deaths
Australian rules footballers from Victoria (Australia)
Australian Rules footballers: place kick exponents
Carlton Football Club players
Carlton Football Club Premiership players
Essendon Association Football Club players
Australian Football Hall of Fame inductees

Four-time VFL/AFL Premiership players
Australian radio personalities
Australian rules football commentators